The Secretary for Justice is the head of the Hong Kong Department of Justice, the chief legal advisor to the Chief Executive of Hong Kong, and the chief law enforcement officer of the Government of Hong Kong. Before the Transfer of the Sovereignty in 1997, the position was known as the Attorney-General of Hong Kong.

The Secretary for Justice, nominated by the Chinese government on the advice of the Chief Executive of Hong Kong, is an ex officio member of the Executive Council of Hong Kong. The Secretary takes office after appointment by the Government of the People's Republic of China, which is responsible for Hong Kong's foreign affairs and defence. The Secretary for Justice also belongs to the Policy Committee, which is chaired by the Chief Secretary,

The Office of the Secretary for Justice was established by the Hong Kong Basic Law, which guarantees the power of the Department of Justice to control criminal prosecutions free from any interference. The position is normally held by a legal professional, and was, before July 2002, a civil service position. The Secretary for Justice, after the Chief Secretary and the Financial Secretary, is one of the three highest Principal Officials of the Government. 
 
The current Secretary for Justice is Paul Lam, SBS, SC, JP.

Role

In the course of discharging his or her duties as the chief legal advisor to the Chief Executive of Hong Kong, the Secretary for Justice is assisted by five law officers, namely:

 the Solicitor General who heads the Legal Policy Division,
 the Director of Public Prosecutions who head the Prosecutions Division,
 the Law Officer (Civil Law) who heads the Civil Law Division,
 the Law Officer (International Law) who heads the International Law Division, and
 the Law Draftsman who heads the Law Drafting Division

(The Administration and Development Division is headed by an Administrative Officer.)

Ranking in the Hong Kong Government

The Secretary for Justice is the third in line, after the Chief Secretary and the Financial Secretary, to act for the Chief Executive when he or she is on leave, outside Hong Kong, or when the position is otherwise temporarily vacant.

The Secretary for Justice ranks fifth in the Hong Kong order of precedence.

Residence

The Secretary for Justice has an official residence at 19 Severn Road, The Peak. Opened in 1934 for use by Attorney General Hong Kong.

Pre-1997 position
Before the 1997 handover to China, the position was known as the Attorney General, and the department was known as the Legal Department and was also known as the Attorney General's Chambers. The office of the Attorney General was never localized during British rule and no Hong Kong Chinese ever held this key post.

List of Secretaries/Attorneys General

Attorneys General, 1844–1997

Secretaries for Justice, 1997–present
Political party:

See also
Attorney general
Justice minister
Minister of Justice (France), who performs similar functions to his or her Hong Kong counterpart

References

Justice, Secretary for
Prosecution
Legal professions
Justice ministers